Krzysztof Pyskaty (born January 18, 1974 in Dębica) is a Polish footballer who plays for Limanovia Limanowa.

External links 
 

1974 births
Living people
Polish footballers
Pogoń Szczecin players
ŁKS Łódź players
Śląsk Wrocław players
Korona Kielce players
Kolejarz Stróże players
People from Dębica
Sportspeople from Podkarpackie Voivodeship
Association football goalkeepers